The Chef John Folse Culinary Institute is an academic college of Nicholls State University in Thibodaux, Louisiana.  The namesake of the college, Chef John Folse, is known as "Louisiana's Culinary Ambassador to the World".

History
The mission of CJFCI as envisioned by Chef Folse and former Nicholls President Donald Ayo was to preserve Louisiana culture and cuisine by teaching chefs, students and community members to master the art of Cajun and Creole cooking. Emphasis was to be placed on the influences of Cajun-Creole cuisine: Native American, Spanish, French, African, German, English and Italian.

CJFCI began offering courses for college credit in 1995. The institute accepted its inaugural academic class in January 1996, offering an associate of science degree. The Louisiana Board of Regents authorized Nicholls to offer a bachelor's degree in culinary arts in 1997, making it the first four-year culinary degree program at a U.S. public university. Today, CJFCI has an enrollment of approximately 200  students and serves as one of the university's "areas of excellence."

Curriculum
In Chef John Folse's Cajun and Creole Cuisine class, students research and prepare Louisiana's regional dishes, such as Duck-Andouille-and-Oyster Gumbo, Crawfish Bisque, Sweet Potato Pecan Pie, and Louisiana Fig Ice Cream. Guest chefs have included Chef Leah Chase of Dooky Chase Restaurant in New Orleans, and Certified Master Chef Fritz Sonnenschmidt.

The Chef John Folse Culinary Institute offers a two-year Associate of Science Degree, as well as a four-year Bachelor of Science Degree. Students study the traditional classic art of cooking, while learning about Louisiana regional cuisine.

Some electives include
 Culinary History of the South
 Food and Wine Pairing
 International Pastries
 Louisiana Seafood
 Regional French Cuisine
 Italian Cuisine
 Contemporary Cajun and Creole Cuisine

The culinary arts program is currently in the Lanny D. Ledet Culinary Arts Building on the Nicholls State University campus, overlooking Bayou Lafourche.

References

Nicholls State University
Cooking schools in the United States
Louisiana cuisine
Acadiana
Education in Lafourche Parish, Louisiana